Amygdalum is a genus of saltwater mussels, marine bivalve mollusks in the family Mytilidae, the true mussels.

Species
Species within the genus Amydalum include:
 Amygdalum papyrium (Conrad, 1846) — paper mussel

References

Mytilidae
Bivalve genera